Good Leader Tavis is a fictional character in the American television series The Purge. Portrayed by Fiona Dourif, she is a zealous cult leader whose followers sacrifice themselves during a night of anarchy, believing that the act will benefit them and others. Throughout the show's first season, a man named Miguel Guerrero pursues Tavis' bus while attempting to save his sister from the group.

Producers initially sought a male actor for the role, but eventually allowed women to audition as well. Dourif was cast immediately after she read for the part. Tavis has received positive reviews from television critics.

Overview
As with other works in its franchise, The Purge takes place during an annual night when crime in America is legalized for 12 hours. The series introduces a cult led by Good Leader Tavis, who has convinced her followers to allow themselves to be killed on Purge Night, claiming that their sacrifice will save others and lead to a pleasant afterlife. Throughout the evening, some of her students begin to question their decision, creating occasional conflicts. Tavis' bus is pursued by former Marine Miguel Guerrero, who seeks to remove his sister Penelope from the cult.

Casting and creation
While developing the TV series, Purge creator James DeMonaco envisioned a nontraditional set of characters whose intention was sacrifice, rather than survival. He pictured the leader as a charismatic man whose followers "offer themselves up as martyrs to people who want to Purge." Around this point in the production, Fiona Dourif had gained popularity for her performances in horror-based projects; Bloody Disgusting labeled the actress a "genre fan-favorite". Producers eventually reconsidered their stance on the character's gender and invited Dourif to audition. She won the part after one reading.

In May 2018, Deadline Hollywood announced that Dourif would join the series as a "much-adored, charismatic cult leader" who would command a number of "fawning followers." Dourif's casting drew quick recognition from Entertainment Weekly, Yahoo!, and other media outlets, with iHorror praising her "knockout talent as an actress." Though listed as a recurring player, Tavis was featured prominently in promotional material, including the series' first trailer, and on USA Network's website.

Having viewed the first two Purge films, Dourif came to see the franchise as a "fun, scary ride [that] makes you think about these bigger issues". When introduced, Tavis is presented as a zealous and unwavering motivator. "Her charisma just takes everybody over," said Dourif, who was primarily drawn to the part because of the influence that the character wields. "It just became this experiment of, what it would be like to be so fully convinced of something, and so passionate and righteous that I can command attention like she does. It was just so fun," she said. 

To prepare for the role, Dourif watched "hours of preaching, and inspirational videos," while basing the character in part on her real-life mother, a former psychic. To further immerse herself in the part, she chose not to view Tavis as a villainess. "I play her as someone who believes in the righteousness of what she's doing. There may be some doubt sometimes, like there is with everything that people do. She's like a painter, who is devoted to her art. She's gonna make the world a better place," she said. Dourif noted that more information on Tavis would be revealed throughout the series, and stated that playing the character "was maybe the most fun I've had on a job, ever."

Reception

In a review of the opening episodes, Spencer Barrett of TV Source lauded the series, but found the arc of lead character Miguel underwhelming. "More interesting is the cult Penelope has joined thanks to a slyly sinister performance by Dourif. While it seems Tavis has the best intentions for her cult 'children,' Dourif's performance lets you know there is more to her character than meets the eye," he said. Mike Walkusky of DirecTV.com labeled Dourif a "majestic" actress, and recognized her as "so good" in the role. Nick Venable of CinemaBlend noted Dourif's "undying smile, which becomes more haunting as the show goes on." Den of Geeks Ronald Hogan evaluated Tavis in a review of episode three. "She's making the Purge work for her. It doesn't have to be all about killing and mayhem. For some, it's protecting others, being a hero. For others, it's all about power, being in charge, controlling others", he said. He also declared, "Fiona Dourif is absolutely brilliant."

Jack O'Keefe wrote an editorial for Bustle.com on Tavis and her cult, noting that the story captured his interest and left him with "a great deal of questions." The editors of Bloody Disgusting featured an image of Tavis in their annual fall preview article, stating, "It will be interesting to see how the action-horror franchise translates to a slower episodic format, but with recurring stars like Fiona Dourif as a cult leader and William Baldwin, you can bet we’re very curious."

References

The Purge
2018 American television series debuts
USA Network original programming
Television characters introduced in 2018
Fictional cult leaders
Fictional murderers of children
American female characters in television
Female villains